Cladonema may refer to:
 Cladonema (hydrozoan), a genus of hydrozoans
 Cladonema (alga), a genus of algae in the family Chromulinaceae